The Feldherrnhalle ("Field Marshals' Hall") is a monumental loggia on the Odeonsplatz in Munich, Germany. Modelled after the Loggia dei Lanzi in Florence, it was commissioned in 1841 by King Ludwig I of Bavaria to honour the tradition of the Bavarian Army.

In 1923, it was the site of the brief battle that ended Hitler's Beer Hall Putsch. During the Nazi era, it served as a monument commemorating the death of 16 members of the Nazi party.

Structure

The Feldherrnhalle was built between 1841 and 1844 at the southern end of Munich's Ludwigstrasse next to the Palais Preysing and east of the Hofgarten. Previously, the Gothic Schwabinger Tor (gate) occupied that place. Friedrich von Gärtner built the Feldherrnhalle at the behest of King Ludwig I of Bavaria after the example of the Loggia dei Lanzi in Florence.

The Feldherrnhalle was a symbol of the honours of the Bavarian Army, represented by statues of two military leaders Johann Tilly and Karl Philipp von Wrede. The first led Bavarians in the Thirty Years War; the second led the fight against Napoleon. The statues were created by Ludwig Schwanthaler.

Right from the start, some Munich folk used to (and still do) ridicule the two persons honoured in the "Bayerische Feldherrnhalle" (lit. 'Bavarian Hall of Field Commanders / Field Marshals') in reference to the descendance of Tilly and the military strategic capabilities of Wrede:
"The one / first was" indeed "never anything like a Bavarian and the second / other" imputedly "never anything like a Feldherr".
It is a citation from Lion Feuchtwanger's novel .

A sculptural group by Ferdinand von Miller was added to the centre of the monument in 1892, after the Franco-Prussian War, representing the victory over the French and the unification of Germany. The lions are a work of Wilhelm von Rümann, added in 1906 in imitation of the Medici lions of the Loggia dei Lanzi.

Site of the Beer Hall Putsch
The Feldherrnhalle was the scene of a confrontation on Friday morning, 9 November 1923, between the Bavarian State Police and the followers of Adolf Hitler in which the Nazi party attempted to storm the Bavarian Defense Ministry. This was the culmination of the Nazis' failed coup attempt to take over the Bavarian State, commonly referred to as the Beer Hall Putsch. In the ensuing gun battle, four policemen and fourteen marchers were killed, plus two more NSDAP members elsewhere in Munich for a total of sixteen. Many more were wounded, including Hermann Göring. As a result of the failure of the so-called Beer Hall Putsch, Hitler was arrested and sentenced to a prison term.

Nazi memorial

After the Nazis took power in 1933, Hitler turned the Feldherrnhalle into a memorial to the Nazis killed during the failed putsch. A memorial to the fallen SA men was put up on its east side, opposite the location of the shootings. This monument, called the Mahnmal der Bewegung was created to a design by Paul Ludwig Troost. It was a rectangular structure listing the names of the martyrs. This was under perpetual ceremonial guard by the SS. The square in front of the Feldherrnhalle (the Odeonsplatz) was used for SS parades and commemorative rallies. During some of these events the sixteen dead were each commemorated by a temporary pillar placed in the Feldherrnhalle topped by a flame. New SS recruits took their oath of loyalty to Hitler in front of the memorial. Passers-by were expected to hail the site with the Nazi salute.

Consequently, some people tried to avoid this. The structure's backside was (and still is) occupied by a rococo palace, the Palais Preysing, in front of which runs a lane, the "Viscardigasse". This little detour helped to bypass the hall, subsequently earning it the nickname "Drückebergergasse" (lit. 'shirker's lane').

Post war

At the end of the war the Feldherrnhalle was restored to its pre-Nazi appearance. Local people spontaneously smashed the Mahnmal der Bewegung to pieces on 3 June 1945. In the 1950s a plan to move Bavaria's memorial to the unknown soldier to the Feldherrnhalle was halted on the grounds that it could provide an excuse for neo-Nazis to meet at the site.

On 25 April 1995, Reinhold Elstner, a World War II veteran, committed self-immolation in front of Feldhernhalle to protest against "the ongoing official slander and demonization of the German people and German soldiers". Each year neo-fascist groups from various European countries try to hold a commemorative ceremony for him, which Bavarian authorities try to prevent through state and federal courts.

See also
 Panzerkorps Feldherrnhalle
 Panzergrenadier-Division Feldherrnhalle
 Blood Order medal

References

 3D computer model

Infrastructure completed in 1844
1840s architecture
1923 in Germany
Buildings and structures in Munich
Historicist architecture in Munich
Tourist attractions in Munich
Beer Hall Putsch
Loggias